Heckscher State Park is a  state park on the shore of the Great South Bay at East Islip in Suffolk County, New York, USA.

History
The park includes  that was once the 19th-century estates of George C. Taylor and J. Neal Plum. Islip's founder, William Nicoll, originally built his estate on this property. The Long Island State Park Commission, led by Robert Moses, expropriated the property in 1924, an action found to be illegal by the state's highest court on the grounds that the law did not permit such expropriation when the Commission did not have the funds to pay for the property; however, in the meantime, the Commission had retained control of the property. Despite opposition from wealthy local residents, the parkland was finally purchased by New York State with the aid of a donation from August Heckscher. The park officially opened in February 1929.

Beginning in 1972 and continuing until 2008, the New York Philharmonic played at Heckscher State Park as part of its free "Concerts in the Parks" series. The annual event was held on summer evenings in an open field near the campground and was open to the public. In 2009, the New York Philharmonic chose to cancel the event for the summer of that year due to financial constraints. After one year without a concert at the park, the Long Island Philharmonic was able to put on a successful performance in 2010. The new generation of concerts commenced with a theme of American composers, including George Gershwin, Leonard Bernstein, John Philip Sousa, John Williams, and Billy Joel.

Park description

Heckscher offers a beach, picnic tables with pavilions, a playground, playing fields and a disc golf course, recreation programs, hiking and biking, fishing, cross-country skiing, a boat launch, and a food concession. It includes the Heckscher Forest, a dedicated disc golf course established in the summer of 2014. The park formerly offered a campground with tent and trailer sites, as well as an Olympic-sized swimming pool, which were closed due to budget cuts.

Heckscher State Park is known as the "Home of the White-tailed Deer", as deer are fairly populous throughout the park. Additionally, about 280 bird species can be observed in the park.

The park is accessible by the Heckscher State Parkway, and falls within the district protected by the Great River Fire Department.

The Long Island Greenbelt Trail starts its  route in Heckscher State Park. It ends in Sunken Meadow State Park.

See also
List of New York state parks

References

External links

 New York State Parks: Heckscher State Park
 Long Island Philharmonic at Heckscher Park

State parks of New York (state)
Beaches of Suffolk County, New York
Islip (town), New York
Robert Moses projects
Parks in Suffolk County, New York
1929 establishments in New York (state)
Protected areas established in 1929